Inquisivi Municipality is the first municipal section of the Inquisivi Province in the  La Paz Department in Bolivia. Its seat is Inquisivi.

The municipality is situated on the eastern slopes of the Kimsa Cruz mountain range between the Altiplano in the west and the Amazon lowlands in the east.

It is bordered to the north by the Sud Yungas Province, to the east by the Cochabamba Department, to the south by the Colquiri Municipality and to the west by Cajuata, Licomapampa, Quime and Ichoca municipalities.

Division 
Inquisivi Municipality is divided into eight cantons:
 Arcopongo - 4,046 inhabitants (2001) 
 Capiñata - 1,699 inhabitants
 Cavari - 2,024 inhabitants
 Eduardo Abaroa - 949 inhabitants 
 Escola - 1,904 inhabitants
 Inquisivi - 3,495 inhabitants
 Pocusco - 960 inhabitants
 Siguas - 1,066 inhabitants

Notable people 
The politician and officer Eliodoro Camacho (1831–1899) was born in Inquisivi.

References 

 National Institute of Statistic of Bolivia
 Gobierno Autónomo Municipal de Inquisivi (Spanish)

Municipalities of La Paz Department (Bolivia)